Kałęczyn may refer to:

Kałęczyn, Ciechanów County in Masovian Voivodeship (east-central Poland)
Kałęczyn, Grodzisk Mazowiecki County in Masovian Voivodeship (east-central Poland)
Kałęczyn, Podlaskie Voivodeship (north-east Poland)
Kałęczyn, Maków County in Masovian Voivodeship (east-central Poland)
Kałęczyn, Ostrów Mazowiecka County in Masovian Voivodeship (east-central Poland)
Kałęczyn, Pułtusk County in Masovian Voivodeship (east-central Poland)
Kałęczyn, Węgrów County in Masovian Voivodeship (east-central Poland)
Kałęczyn, Warmian-Masurian Voivodeship (north Poland)